The 12th FINA Synchronised Swimming World Cup was held September 16–19, 2010 in Changshu, China. It featured swimmers from 23 nations, swimming in four events: Solo, Duet, Team and Free Combination.

Participating nations
23 nations swam at the 2010 Synchronized Swimming World Cup:

Results

Final standings

References

FINA Synchronized Swimming World Cup
2010 in synchronized swimming
International aquatics competitions hosted by China
2010 in Chinese sport
September 2010 sports events in China
Synchronized swimming competitions in China